José Romo de Vivar was a Novo Hispanic rancher and miner, considered to be one of the early settlers in Arizona. In 1700, Vivar drove his cattle to the Huachuca Mountains because he was convinced he could carve out a future in that territory. Despite the emigration of most of the Spanish settlers of Arizona before a number of factors, Vivar stayed in this land and he helped to the permanence of some few Spanish people in Arizona, together with the Italian Jesuit Eusebio Kino.

His grandfather was Diego Romo de Vivar (1589–1691), a Spanish explorer and military officer, who conquered a large part of the present day  Chihuahua, in modern Mexico.

The factors that had driven to the emigration of most of the Arizona´s Spaniards were diverse: The silver mines that had attracted Spaniards to colonize the area were sold out. So its new inhabitants were forced to practice agriculture and livestock, which were unattractive jobs for these people. This was compounded by the continuing hostility of the Pima Indians (riots, killings, scorched earth, poisoned wells, etc.), which made it difficult to stay in the region by settlers. These factors pushed the majority of them to leave the area.

References

External links 
 State of Arizona's Heritage Horse

People in colonial Arizona
Pre-statehood history of Arizona